The 1933 BYU Cougars football team was an American football team that represented Brigham Young University (BYU) as a member of the Rocky Mountain Conference (RMC) during the 1933 college football season. In their sixth season under head coach G. Ott Romney, the Cougars compiled an overall record of 5–4 with a mark of 5–3 against conference opponents, finished fifth in the RMC, and were outscored by a total of 104 to 69.

Schedule

References

BYU
BYU Cougars football seasons
BYU Cougars football